Aphanisticus is a genus of beetles in the family Buprestidae, containing the following species:

 Aphanisticus aculeatus Théry, 1930
 Aphanisticus aegyptiacus Théry, 1930
 Aphanisticus aeneicollis Kerremans, 1896
 Aphanisticus aeneolus Kerremans, 1896
 Aphanisticus aeneomaculatus Fisher, 1937
 Aphanisticus aequinoxialis Thomson, 1879
 Aphanisticus aereus Théry, 1930
 Aphanisticus affinis Kerremans, 1900
 Aphanisticus afflatus Théry, 1948
 Aphanisticus aloisii Obenberger, 1937
 Aphanisticus amblyderus Fairmaire, 1876
 Aphanisticus ambodiranus Obenberger, 1937
 Aphanisticus ammon Théry, 1930
 Aphanisticus angolensis Théry, 1947
 Aphanisticus angustatus Lucas, 1846
 Aphanisticus angustifrons Théry, 1912
 Aphanisticus anniae Obenberger, 1932
 Aphanisticus antennatus Saunders, 1873
 Aphanisticus apayaoi Obenberger, 1928
 Aphanisticus apicalis Obenberger, 1928
 Aphanisticus arcuaticollis Motschulsky, 1861
 Aphanisticus assinicus Kerremans, 1903
 Aphanisticus ater Gory & Laporte, 1840
 Aphanisticus auberti Théry, 1930
 Aphanisticus aureocupreus (Kerremans, 1892)
 Aphanisticus auriculatus Gory & Laporte, 1840
 Aphanisticus autumnalis Obenberger, 1928
 Aphanisticus bakeri Fisher, 1921
 Aphanisticus baldasseronii Obenberger, 1939
 Aphanisticus bananaensis Obenberger, 1928
 Aphanisticus batoensis Obenberger, 1928
 Aphanisticus baumi Obenberger, 1928
 Aphanisticus bedeli Abeille de Perrin, 1893
 Aphanisticus belial Obenberger, 1928
 Aphanisticus bevinsi Théry, 1930
 Aphanisticus biafranus Obenberger, 1921
 Aphanisticus bicolor Kerremans, 1896
 Aphanisticus bilobiceps Kerremans, 1903
 Aphanisticus bilyi Kalashian, 1996
 Aphanisticus binhensis Descarpentries & Villiers, 1963
 Aphanisticus bison Théry, 1930
 Aphanisticus bispinosus Théry, 1930
 Aphanisticus bispinus Motschulsky, 1861
 Aphanisticus blackburni Carter, 1924
 Aphanisticus blaisei Descarpentries & Villiers, 1963
 Aphanisticus bogosicus Théry, 1930
 Aphanisticus bohaci Obenberger, 1924
 Aphanisticus bolmi Kalashian, 2004
 Aphanisticus borkuanus Descarpentries & Bruneau de Miré, 1963
 Aphanisticus bottegoi Kerremans, 1898
 Aphanisticus bourgoini Obenberger, 1928
 Aphanisticus bouvieri Théry, 1905
 Aphanisticus brevior Obenberger, 1928
 Aphanisticus browni Carter, 1924
 Aphanisticus bulbatus Bílý, 1973
 Aphanisticus caesareus Obenberger, 1928
 Aphanisticus calcuttensis Obenberger, 1928
 Aphanisticus camerunicus Théry, 1930
 Aphanisticus capensis Obenberger, 1928
 Aphanisticus capicola Théry, 1930
 Aphanisticus capricornis Obenberger, 1940
 Aphanisticus carbonarius Théry, 1930
 Aphanisticus celer Obenberger, 1928
 Aphanisticus cerdo Obenberger, 1928
 Aphanisticus cervicornis Obenberger, 1940
 Aphanisticus chloris Obenberger, 1928
 Aphanisticus clamator Théry, 1930
 Aphanisticus clavicornis Obenberger, 1918
 Aphanisticus cochinchinae Obenberger, 1924
 Aphanisticus coeruleiclytris Obenberger, 1937
 Aphanisticus coeruleipennis Théry, 1930
 Aphanisticus coerulescens Théry, 1930
 Aphanisticus collinus Obenberger, 1928
 Aphanisticus compactilis Obenberger, 1937
 Aphanisticus confusus Deyrolle, 1864
 Aphanisticus congener Saunders, 1875
 Aphanisticus connicki Baudon, 1968
 Aphanisticus conradsi Obenberger, 1937
 Aphanisticus consanguineus Ritsema, 1897
 Aphanisticus convexicollis Obenberger, 1928
 Aphanisticus coomani Descarpentries & Villiers, 1963
 Aphanisticus cordicollis Deyrolle, 1864
 Aphanisticus corniceps Obenberger, 1924
 Aphanisticus cornifer Théry, 1930
 Aphanisticus coronatus Théry, 1930
 Aphanisticus costatus Théry, 1930
 Aphanisticus costipennis Fisher, 1921
 Aphanisticus crassulus Obenberger, 1937
 Aphanisticus cristatus Kerremans, 1894
 Aphanisticus cupreomicans Obenberger, 1937
 Aphanisticus cupricornis Kerremans, 1892
 Aphanisticus curvicollis Kerremans, 1914
 Aphanisticus cylindricus Théry, 1930
 Aphanisticus damalonensis Obenberger, 1928
 Aphanisticus daoensis Kalashian, 2004
 Aphanisticus dapitani Obenberger, 1924
 Aphanisticus davidi Obenberger, 1937
 Aphanisticus decaryi Théry, 1930
 Aphanisticus decorsei Théry, 1930
 Aphanisticus delicatulus Fåhraeus in Boheman, 1851
 Aphanisticus dembickyi Kalashian, 1999
 Aphanisticus denticauda Kalashian, 1993
 Aphanisticus denticulatus Théry, 1912
 Aphanisticus descarpentriesi Kalashian, 1993
 Aphanisticus dessumi Descarpentries & Villiers, 1963
 Aphanisticus diabolicus Deyrolle, 1864
 Aphanisticus dicax Théry, 1930
 Aphanisticus dichrous Obenberger, 1928
 Aphanisticus difficilis Théry, 1930
 Aphanisticus dimorphus Théry, 1941
 Aphanisticus distinctus Perris, 1864
 Aphanisticus diversulus Obenberger, 1937
 Aphanisticus drescheri Fisher, 1937
 Aphanisticus dualaicus Obenberger, 1937
 Aphanisticus dubius Théry, 1930
 Aphanisticus edax Théry, 1930
 Aphanisticus elegans Théry, 1905
 Aphanisticus elongatus (Villa & Villa, 1835)
 Aphanisticus elphus Obenberger, 1940
 Aphanisticus emarginatus (Olivier, 1790)
 Aphanisticus endeloides Carter, 1924
 Aphanisticus eryx Théry, 1930
 Aphanisticus excavatus Fisher, 1921
 Aphanisticus filiformis Kerremans, 1896
 Aphanisticus fluviatilis Kerremans, 1896
 Aphanisticus fossidiscus Obenberger, 1944
 Aphanisticus fossulipennis Obenberger, 1928
 Aphanisticus foveicollis Fisher, 1921
 Aphanisticus funebris Théry, 1930
 Aphanisticus galeatus Théry, 1930
 Aphanisticus gayaneae Kalashian, 2004
 Aphanisticus gebhardti Obenberger, 1924
 Aphanisticus gedyei Théry, 1941
 Aphanisticus genesti Théry, 1930
 Aphanisticus gerstaeckeri Obenberger, 1928
 Aphanisticus gestroanus Obenberger, 1932
 Aphanisticus gestroi Kerremans, 1894
 Aphanisticus goudotii Gory & Laporte, 1840
 Aphanisticus grandidieri Théry, 1912
 Aphanisticus grandis Théry, 1930
 Aphanisticus gratiosus Théry, 1948
 Aphanisticus grossei Obenberger, 1937
 Aphanisticus guyoni Théry, 1930
 Aphanisticus harauensis Kalashian, 2005
 Aphanisticus hargreavesi Obenberger, 1928
 Aphanisticus harlequin Obenberger, 1944
 Aphanisticus helferi Cobos, 1964
 Aphanisticus herbigradus Obenberger, 1937
 Aphanisticus hewitti Kerremans, 1912
 Aphanisticus horaki Kalashian, 2003
 Aphanisticus hova Kerremans, 1899
 Aphanisticus imitator Théry, 1948
 Aphanisticus immixtus Obenberger, 1928
 Aphanisticus impressicollis Deyrolle, 1864
 Aphanisticus impressipennis Fairmaire, 1901
 Aphanisticus inaequalicollis Obenberger, 1937
 Aphanisticus incostatus Théry, 1930
 Aphanisticus indicus Obenberger, 1928
 Aphanisticus inornatus Théry, 1905
 Aphanisticus insculptus Fåhraeus in Boheman, 1851
 Aphanisticus insularis Kerremans, 1894
 Aphanisticus insulicolus Cobos, 1959
 Aphanisticus intaminatus Obenberger, 1928
 Aphanisticus integer Théry, 1930
 Aphanisticus integricollis Théry, 1905
 Aphanisticus ituricolus Obenberger, 1937
 Aphanisticus ituriensis Obenberger, 1928
 Aphanisticus jakobsoni Obenberger, 1928
 Aphanisticus javaecola Obenberger, 1932
 Aphanisticus javanicus Obenberger, 1928
 Aphanisticus jendeki Kalashian, 2005
 Aphanisticus juvencus Théry, 1930
 Aphanisticus kabakovi Kalashian, 1993
 Aphanisticus kalabi Kalashian, 2003
 Aphanisticus kalshoveni Obenberger, 1931
 Aphanisticus kanabei Kaszab, 1940
 Aphanisticus kaszabi Cobos, 1968
 Aphanisticus kerremansi Théry, 1930
 Aphanisticus kiniaticus Obenberger, 1928
 Aphanisticus klapperichi Obenberger, 1944
 Aphanisticus kolibaci Kalashian, 1999
 Aphanisticus krusemanni Obenberger, 1937
 Aphanisticus kubani Kalashian, 1996
 Aphanisticus lacertus Théry, 1930
 Aphanisticus laetus Théry, 1930
 Aphanisticus lafermei Novak, 2003
 Aphanisticus lamellicornis Théry, 1930
 Aphanisticus latro Théry, 1930
 Aphanisticus latus Kerremans, 1903
 Aphanisticus lembanus Kerremans, 1912
 Aphanisticus leonensis Kerremans, 1903
 Aphanisticus leonigena Obenberger, 1928
 Aphanisticus lepidus Obenberger, 1928
 Aphanisticus levipennis Kerremans, 1900
 Aphanisticus limayicus Obenberger, 1928
 Aphanisticus lineolatus Obenberger, 1928
 Aphanisticus lineoliger Obenberger, 1937
 Aphanisticus lubopetri Kalashian, 2004
 Aphanisticus lumareti Kalashian, 1999
 Aphanisticus lunifrons Théry, 1930
 Aphanisticus luzonicolus Obenberger, 1928
 Aphanisticus madagascariensis Obenberger, 1937
 Aphanisticus maleficus Théry, 1905
 Aphanisticus malignus Théry, 1930
 Aphanisticus mandarinus Gebhardt, 1928
 Aphanisticus marginicollis Gestro, 1877
 Aphanisticus margotanae Novak, 1993
 Aphanisticus marseulii Tournier, 1868
 Aphanisticus martini Descarpentries & Villiers, 1963
 Aphanisticus mascarenicus Descarpentries, 1973
 Aphanisticus masoni Théry, 1930
 Aphanisticus massaicus Théry, 1930
 Aphanisticus mathiauxi Théry, 1930
 Aphanisticus maynaei Kerremans, 1912
 Aphanisticus mendax Théry, 1930
 Aphanisticus metallescens Kerremans, 1892
 Aphanisticus microcephalus Kalashian, 2003
 Aphanisticus micros Théry, 1930
 Aphanisticus miguelicus Obenberger, 1928
 Aphanisticus miles Obenberger, 1928
 Aphanisticus mindanaoensis Fisher, 1921
 Aphanisticus minutus Kerremans, 1896
 Aphanisticus mirandulus Obenberger, 1937
 Aphanisticus missus Obenberger, 1937
 Aphanisticus mitratus (Chevrolat, 1838)
 Aphanisticus montanus Fisher, 1926
 Aphanisticus moultoni Kerremans, 1912
 Aphanisticus mrazeki Obenberger, 1928
 Aphanisticus munroi Obenberger, 1928
 Aphanisticus mutator Théry, 1930
 Aphanisticus nanissimus Obenberger, 1937
 Aphanisticus natalensis Théry, 1930
 Aphanisticus natalicola Obenberger, 1928
 Aphanisticus nervosus Kerremans, 1903
 Aphanisticus nigerrimus Kerremans, 1896
 Aphanisticus nigritorum Obenberger, 1928
 Aphanisticus nigroaeneus Kerremans, 1900
 Aphanisticus nitidulipennis Obenberger, 1937
 Aphanisticus nitidus Théry, 1930
 Aphanisticus nocivus Théry, 1930
 Aphanisticus nodosus Gerstäcker, 1871
 Aphanisticus obesus Théry, 1930
 Aphanisticus oblongus Kerremans, 1895
 Aphanisticus observator Obenberger, 1928
 Aphanisticus obsoletulus Obenberger, 1918
 Aphanisticus obtusicornis Théry, 1930
 Aphanisticus okinawanus Ohmomo, 2004
 Aphanisticus opacus (Kerremans, 1913)
 Aphanisticus oreophilus Fisher, 1937
 Aphanisticus oresibatus Obenberger, 1928
 Aphanisticus othello Obenberger, 1928
 Aphanisticus ovalis Kerremans, 1900
 Aphanisticus pacholatkoi Kalashian, 2005
 Aphanisticus pacificus Théry, 1930
 Aphanisticus paradoxus Deyrolle, 1864
 Aphanisticus pendleburyi Fisher, 1933
 Aphanisticus peninsulae Obenberger, 1924
 Aphanisticus perakensis Obenberger, 1924
 Aphanisticus perinetensis Obenberger, 1937
 Aphanisticus perpusillus Obenberger, 1918
 Aphanisticus perraudierei van de Poll, 1892
 Aphanisticus perroti Descarpentries & Villiers, 1963
 Aphanisticus peyerimhoffi Descarpentries, 1949
 Aphanisticus philippinensis Kalashian, 2003
 Aphanisticus piceipennis Fisher, 1921
 Aphanisticus planatus Théry, 1930
 Aphanisticus planidorsulus Obenberger, 1940
 Aphanisticus plantivorus Obenberger, 1937
 Aphanisticus protensus Obenberger, 1928
 Aphanisticus protractipennis Obenberger, 1928
 Aphanisticus pseudochloris Kalashian, 2003
 Aphanisticus pulex Théry, 1930
 Aphanisticus pullus Fåhraeus in Boheman, 1851
 Aphanisticus pumilio Fåhraeus in Boheman, 1851
 Aphanisticus punctatostriatus Théry, 1930
 Aphanisticus punctulivertex Obenberger, 1944
 Aphanisticus pusillus (Olivier, 1790)
 Aphanisticus putus Obenberger, 1937
 Aphanisticus pycnus Obenberger, 1937
 Aphanisticus pygmaeus Lucas, 1846
 Aphanisticus quadraticollis Obenberger, 1928
 Aphanisticus raffrayi Théry, 1930
 Aphanisticus rarus Théry, 1930
 Aphanisticus rhynchophorus Obenberger, 1928
 Aphanisticus rollei Théry, 1912
 Aphanisticus rondoni Baudon, 1962
 Aphanisticus rotundicollis Théry, 1912
 Aphanisticus sagax Théry, 1930
 Aphanisticus sandakanus Obenberger, 1924
 Aphanisticus satanas Deyrolle, 1864
 Aphanisticus scheitzae Burgeon, 1941
 Aphanisticus schroderi Théry, 1930
 Aphanisticus schuhi Novak, 1995
 Aphanisticus scotti Théry, 1937
 Aphanisticus sculptipennis Bílý, 1983
 Aphanisticus semicaeruleus Théry, 1930
 Aphanisticus seriepunctatus Obenberger, 1928
 Aphanisticus shimoganus Obenberger, 1940
 Aphanisticus sicardi Théry, 1905
 Aphanisticus similis Théry, 1930
 Aphanisticus simplex Fairmaire, 1901
 Aphanisticus sinicolus Obenberger, 1944
 Aphanisticus somalicus Théry, 1930
 Aphanisticus soppoensis Obenberger, 1928
 Aphanisticus soppongi Kalashian, 2004
 Aphanisticus soudeki Obenberger, 1928
 Aphanisticus straeleni Théry, 1948
 Aphanisticus stramineus Obenberger, 1937
 Aphanisticus strandi Obenberger, 1928
 Aphanisticus strandianus Obenberger, 1928
 Aphanisticus strangulatus Théry, 1930
 Aphanisticus striatipennis Kalashian, 2003
 Aphanisticus subcylindricus Théry, 1930
 Aphanisticus subfasciatus Motschulsky, 1861
 Aphanisticus sugonjaevi Alexeev in Alexeev, et al., 1992
 Aphanisticus sulcicollis Walker, 1858
 Aphanisticus sulculiceps Obenberger, 1937
 Aphanisticus sumatrensis Kerremans, 1900
 Aphanisticus swierstrae Obenberger, 1928
 Aphanisticus taciturnus Kerremans, 1898
 Aphanisticus tananarivensis Obenberger, 1937
 Aphanisticus tanovanensis Obenberger, 1937
 Aphanisticus tassii Baudon, 1968
 Aphanisticus taurus Théry, 1930
 Aphanisticus tennasserimi Obenberger, 1928
 Aphanisticus tenuolus Obenberger, 1937
 Aphanisticus tessmanni Théry, 1930
 Aphanisticus theodori Obenberger, 1928
 Aphanisticus theryellus Obenberger, 1937
 Aphanisticus tondui Théry, 1912
 Aphanisticus trachyformis Fisher, 1921
 Aphanisticus triangularis Théry, 1930
 Aphanisticus turneri Théry, 1930
 Aphanisticus ugandae Théry, 1930
 Aphanisticus ukerewensis Obenberger, 1937
 Aphanisticus ukerewigena Obenberger, 1940
 Aphanisticus unicolor Fisher, 1921
 Aphanisticus vanderijsti Obenberger, 1928
 Aphanisticus vasculus Théry, 1930
 Aphanisticus vaulogeri Descarpentries & Villiers, 1963
 Aphanisticus vicinus Kerremans, 1896
 Aphanisticus victoriae Kerremans, 1910
 Aphanisticus vietnamensis Kalashian, 2004
 Aphanisticus viridicornis Théry, 1930
 Aphanisticus viridipennis Kerremans, 1900
 Aphanisticus viridisignatus Kalashian, 2004
 Aphanisticus viti Kalashian, 2004
 Aphanisticus volkovitshi Kalashian, 1994
 Aphanisticus vulcanus Théry, 1948
 Aphanisticus waterloti Théry, 1930
 Aphanisticus weyersi Kerremans, 1900
 Aphanisticus wittei Théry, 1948
 Aphanisticus yasumatsui Kurosawa, 1954
 Aphanisticus zambesicus Obenberger, 1928
 Aphanisticus zanzibaricus Obenberger, 1928
 Aphanisticus zulu Théry, 1930
 Aphanisticus zuluanus Obenberger, 1928

References

Buprestidae genera